China competed in the 1997 East Asian Games which were held in Busan, South Korea from May 10, 1997, to May 19, 1997.

See also
 China at the Asian Games
 China at the Olympics
 Sports in China

1997 East Asian Games
1997
1997 in Chinese sport